Valleyview may refer to:

Places
 Valleyview, Ohio, US
 Valleyview, Alberta, Canada
 Valleyview, Kamloops, Canada, BC
 Valleyview Provincial Park, in the list of provincial parks in Nova Scotia, Canada

Schools
 Valleyview Elementary School (disambiguation)

 Valleyview Centennial School (Brandon, Manitoba), Canada

Other uses
 Valleyview (microarchitecture), used in Intel Atom processors

See also
 Valley View (disambiguation)